Madison County is a county in the U.S. state of Nebraska. As of the 2010 United States Census, the population was 34,876. Its county seat is Madison and its largest city is Norfolk. Madison County was named for James Madison, fourth President of the United States.

Madison County is part of the Norfolk, NE Micropolitan Statistical Area.

In the Nebraska license plate system, Madison County is represented by the prefix 7 (the county had the seventh-largest number of vehicles registered in the state when the license plate system was established in 1922).

Geography
The terrain in Madison County consists of gently rolling terrain, sloped to the east-southeast, largely devoted to agriculture. The Elkhorn River runs eastward across the upper central portion of the county.

Major highways

  U.S. Highway 81
  U.S. Highway 275
  Nebraska Highway 24
  Nebraska Highway 32
  Nebraska Highway 35
  Nebraska Highway 45
  Nebraska Highway 121

Adjacent counties

 Wayne County – northeast
 Stanton County – east
 Platte County – south
 Boone County – southwest
 Antelope County – northwest
 Pierce County – north

Protected areas
 Oak Valley State Wildlife Management Area
 Yellowbanks State Wildlife Management Area

Demographics

As of the 2000 United States Census, there were 35,226 people, 13,436 households, and 8,894 families in the county. The population density was 62 people per square mile (24/km2). There were 14,432 housing units at an average density of 25 per square mile (10/km2). The racial makeup of the county was 91.35% White, 0.94% Black or African American, 1.19% Native American, 0.40% Asian, 0.03% Pacific Islander, 5.06% from other races, and 1.03% from two or more races. 8.64% of the population were Hispanic or Latino of any race.

There were 13,436 households, out of which 33.20% had children under the age of 18 living with them, 54.70% were married couples living together, 8.40% had a female householder with no husband present, and 33.80% were non-families. 27.90% of all households were made up of individuals, and 12.40% had someone living alone who was 65 years of age or older. The average household size was 2.52 and the average family size was 3.12.

The county population contained 26.80% under the age of 18, 11.60% from 18 to 24, 27.10% from 25 to 44, 20.10% from 45 to 64, and 14.40% who were 65 years of age or older. The median age was 35 years. For every 100 females, there were 98.50 males. For every 100 females age 18 and over, there were 94.80 males.

The median income for a household in the county was $35,807, and the median income for a family was $45,073. Males had a median income of $30,631 versus $21,343 for females. The per capita income for the county was $16,804. About 7.50% of families and 11.20% of the population were below the poverty line, including 13.00% of those under age 18 and 11.50% of those age 65 or over.

Communities

Cities 

 Battle Creek
 Madison  (county seat)
 Newman Grove (partial)
 Norfolk
 Tilden (partial)

Village 

 Meadow Grove

Unincorporated communities 

 Emerick
 Enola
 Kalamazoo
 Warnerville

Politics
Madison County voters have been strongly Republican for many decades, voting for the Republican candidate in every presidential election except for three from 1880 onward. In addition, no Democratic presidential candidate has won the county since 1936.

See also
 National Register of Historic Places listings in Madison County, Nebraska
 Madison County USGenWeb

References

 
Nebraska counties
Norfolk Micropolitan Statistical Area
1867 establishments in Nebraska
Populated places established in 1867